Events in the year 1988 in Cyprus.

Incumbents 

 President: Demetris Christofias
 President of the Parliament: Yiannakis Omirou

Events 
Ongoing – Cyprus dispute

 14 February – George Vassiliou, an independent candidate supported by AKEL, defeated Glafcos Clerides of the Democratic Rally in presidential elections. They were the first presidential elections in the country's history to go to a second round. Voter turnout was 94.3% in both rounds.
 September – 1988 Non-Aligned Foreign Ministers Conference was held in Nicosia.

Deaths

References 

 
1980s in Cyprus
Years of the 21st century in Cyprus
Cyprus
Cyprus
Cyprus